Nanda may refer to:

Indian history and religion
 Nanda Empire, ruled by the Nanda dynasty, an Indian royal dynasty ruling Magadha in the 4th century BCE
 Mahapadma Nanda, first Emperor of the Nanda Empire
 Dhana Nanda (died c. 321 BCE), last ruler of the Nanda dynasty
 Nanda (Buddhist nun), half-sister of Siddhartha Gautama, who became Gautama Buddha
 Nanda (half-brother of Buddha) or Sundarananda
 Nanda Baba, a character in Hindu mythology, foster-father of god Krishna

Other people
 Nanda (surname), an Indian surname
 Nanda (actress) (1939–2014), Indian film actress
 Nanda Bayin (1535–1600), king of Burma (r. 1581–99)
 Nanda people, an Aboriginal Australian people of Western Australia

Other uses
 Nanda (film), a 2009 Indian Kannada film
 NANDA International, formerly the North American Nursing Diagnosis Association
 Nanda, Maharashtra, a town in India
 Nanjing University or Nanda, in Jiangsu, China

See also
 Nandha, a 2001 Indian Tamil film
 Fernanda, a feminine given name
 Nand (disambiguation)